Gloria Catherine Najjuka (born 24 August 1988) is a Ugandan female badminton player. In 2010, she competed at the Commonwealth Games in Delhi, India.

Achievements

BWF International Challenge/Series
Women's Doubles

 BWF International Challenge tournament
 BWF International Series tournament
 BWF Future Series tournament

References

External links
 

1988 births
Living people
Ugandan female badminton players
Badminton players at the 2010 Commonwealth Games
Commonwealth Games competitors for Uganda
Competitors at the 2007 All-Africa Games
African Games competitors for Uganda